Fundão is a municipality in Espírito Santo, south eastern Brazil. Its population was 21,948 (2020) and its area is 280 km².

History

This municipality was created on the 5 July 1923. It was created from part of Nova Almeida municipality, which today is no longer a municipality but a town (distrito in Portuguese) of Serra municipality.

Location
Situated about 57 km from the state capital Vitória. Bordering municipalities include: Aracruz and Ibiraçu (N), Santa Teresa and Santa Leopoldina (W), Serra, Espírito Santo (S) and the Atlantic Ocean (E).

The coastline of the municipality is protected by the  Costa das Algas Environmental Protection Area, created in 2010.

See also
IBGE

References

Populated coastal places in Espírito Santo
Municipalities in Espírito Santo